The Federal Ministry of Finance is the government body that manages the finances of the Federal Government of Nigeria, including managing, controlling and monitoring federal revenues and expenditures.

Roles of finance ministry:
Some of the role of the finance ministry include collecting and disbursing government revenue, 
formulating policies on taxation, tariffs, fiscal management etc., 
preparing and managing the annual budget, 
preparing annual accounts for ministries, departments and agencies, 
managing federal debt and
regulating the capital market.

Leadership
A senior civil servant acts as Permanent Secretary of the minister, assisting the politically appointed Minister of Finance, who is a member of the President's cabinet.
Stephen Osagiede Oronsaye was appointed Permanent Secretary of the Federal Ministry of Finance on August 20, 2008.
He was appointed Head of the Nigerian Civil Service in June 2009.
The Permanent Secretary as of December 2009 was Dr. Ochi C. Achinivu. 
Shamsuddeen Usman was Minister of Finance from July 2007 to January 2009, when he was replaced by Mansur Muhtar. Ngozi Okonjo-Iweala, assumed office as the Minister of Finance on 11 July 2011 through 29 May 2015. Kemi Adeosun was appointed by Muhammadu Buhari and assumed the office of Finance Minister in 2015. Kemi Adeosun resigned from the cabinet as a result of complications with her discharged certificate from the National Youth Service Corp. Mrs Zainab Ahmed was recently appointed as the Minister of Finance.

Parastatals and agencies

The Ministry of Finance is responsible for a number of parastatals and agencies:
 Office of the Accountant General of the Federation Of Nigeria
 Central Bank of Nigeria
 Federal Inland Revenue Service
 Investment and Security Tribunal
 National Insurance Commission
 Nigerian Export Import Bank
 Nigeria Deposit Insurance Corporation
 Nigerian Customs Service
 Security and Exchange Commission

See also

Finance Minister of Nigeria
Federal Ministries of Nigeria
Nigerian Civil Service

References

External links 
 Official homepage

Nigeria
Federal Ministries of Nigeria